This article describes all the 2014 seasons of Formula Renault series across the world.

Calendar
This table indicates the round number of each Formula Renault series according to weekend dates. The dark note indicates Winter Series dates.

Formula Renault 3.5L

Formula Renault 2.0L

2014 Formula Renault 2.0 Eurocup season

2014 Formula Renault 2.0 Northern European Cup season

2014 Formula Renault 2.0 Alps season

2014 Protyre Formula Renault Championship season

2014 Asian Formula Renault Series season

Formula Renault 1.6L

2014 French F4 Championship season

2014 Formula Renault 1.6 NEC season
Point system : 30, 24, 20, 17, 16, 15, 14, 13, 12, 11, 10, 9, 8, 7, 6, 5, 4, 3, 2, 1 for 20th. No points for Fastest lap or Pole position.
Round at Nürburgring was non-championship.

Notes:
† — Drivers did not finish the race, but were classified

Teams' championship

2014 Formula Renault 1.6 Nordic season

2014 Formula Renault 1.6 NEZ season

Other Formulas powered by Renault championships

2014 V de V Challenge Monoplace season

2014 Remus Formula Renault 2.0 Cup season
The season was held between 17 May and 11 October and raced across Austria, Germany, Italy and Czech Republic. The races occur with other categories as part of the Austria Formula 3 Cup, this section presents only the Austrian Formula Renault 2.0 classifications. Division II cars were built between 2000 - 2009.

2014 Formula Renault 2.0 Argentina season
All cars use Tito 02 chassis, all races were held in Argentina, except for one round in Chile.

1 extra point in each race for regularly qualified drivers.

References

Renault
Formula Renault seasons